Keap (formerly Infusionsoft) is a private company that offers an e-mail marketing and sales platform for small businesses, including products to manage customers, customer relationship management, marketing, and e-commerce. It is based in Chandler, Arizona.

The company received $54 million in venture capital from Goldman Sachs in early 2013. In total, the company has generated over $125 million in funding.

History 
Infusionsoft was founded in 2001 by brothers Scott and Eric Martineau in Mesa, Arizona with now CEO Clate Mask.

In 2004, the company developed a script to automate sales leads, which became the foundation of Infusionsoft’s SaaS product range.

As of January 2019, the company is known as Keap.

In February 2020, The improvements have emerged after the small business selling and marketing software company modified its name in January 2019 after 18 years of operation as Infusionsoft to Keap and started providing non-tech experienced businesses a smaller, simplified variant of their apps.

Company overview 
Keap offers an integrated email marketing platform for small business users.

The Keap platform can create and host Web forms and links, execute automated campaigns, track ROI, provide customer sales updates, database management and e-commerce functionality.

Recognition 
Infusionsoft was named by Inc. as a 2013 Hire Power Awardee and ranked number 4 in the software category with over 240 jobs created in a year. Infusionsoft has been honored as an Inc. 500/5000 list of fastest growing private company 7 times as of 2013. Inc. also ranked the company #47 on its list of Top 100 Arizona Companies and #44 on its list of companies in the Phoenix metro.

References

External links 
 

Software companies established in 2001
Software companies based in Arizona
Companies based in Chandler, Arizona
Software companies of the United States